The Crimson Skull is a 1922 American silent Western film that was produced by the Norman Film Manufacturing Company. The six-reel film was made on location in Boley, Oklahoma and was made along with The Bull-Dogger, which its release followed. Local cowboys appear in the film backing up the actors and professional rodeo performer Bill Pickett. It was marketed as a "Baffling Western Mystery Photo-play". Press books for the film remain in existence.

Cast
 Anita Bush
 Lawrence Chenault
 Bill Pickett
 Steve “Peg” Reynolds

References

1922 films
1922 Western (genre) films
1922 lost films
American black-and-white films
Films shot in Oklahoma
Lost American films
Lost Western (genre) films
Okfuskee County, Oklahoma
Silent American Western (genre) films
1920s American films